The 1941 National Football League Draft was held on December 10, 1940, at the Willard Hotel in Washington D.C. With the first overall pick of the draft, the Chicago Bears selected halfback Tom Harmon.

Player selections

Round 1

Round 2

Round 3

Round 4

Round 5

Round 6

Round 7

Round 8

Round 9

Round 10

Round 11

Round 12

Round 13

Round 14

Round 15

Round 16

Round 17

Round 18

Round 19

Round 20

Round 21

Round 22

Hall of Famers
 Tony Canadeo, halfback from Gonzaga University taken 9th round 77th overall by the Green Bay Packers.
Inducted: Professional Football Hall of Fame class of 1974.

Notable undrafted players

References

External links
 NFL.com – 1941 Draft
 databaseFootball.com – 1941 Draft
 Pro Football Hall of Fame

National Football League Draft
Draft
December 1940 sports events
1940 in sports in Washington, D.C.
Events in Washington, D.C.
American football in Washington, D.C.